The Laser Vago is a British/American sailing dinghy that was designed by Jo Richards  as a one-design racer and first built in 2005.

Production
The design was built by LaserPerformance in United  Kingdom and in the United States starting in 2005. By 2022 it was out of production.

Design
The Laser Vago is a recreational sailboat, built predominantly of rotational moulded polyethylene tri-skin foam sandwich. The hull has a sharply single chined design. It has a fractional sloop rig, a raked stem, a plumb transom, a transom-hung rudder controlled by a tiller and a retractable daggerboard. It displaces .

With the daggerboard removed the boat can be beached or transported on a trailer or car roof rack.

There are "standard" and XD "race" models, with the latter model equipped with sails of larger area. The boat is rated as a skill level of intermediate to advanced.

For sailing the design may be equipped with an asymmetrical spinnaker, flown from a retractable bowsprit and a single trapeze.

The design has a Royal Yacht Club Portsmouth Yardstick racing average handicap of 1074 and is normally raced with a crew of one or two sailors.

Operational history

The boat was named Sailing World magazine's "Best One-Design Dinghy" for 2007.

In a 2007 review for Sailing World, Chuck Allen wrote, "This boat is designed to be many things; singlehander, doublehander, fast trainer, and all-around fun, planing dinghy for whoever feels the need for speed in an inexpensive, durable design. Several key design features enable this 13'9" rocketship to get on a plane sooner than similar dinghies. The hard chine Richards designed into the hull combines with its rocker, which makes the boat handle like a dream during maneuvers. Its flared gunwales provide flotation and good righting moment. The XD version, which has 30 more square feet of sail area than the standard Vago, as well as a trapeze, is, quite simply, a ton of fun to sail ... Overall, sailing the boat is a great experience mostly because of the speed."

See also
List of sailing boat types

References

External links

Dinghies
2000s sailboat type designs
Two-person sailboats
Sailboat type designs by Jo Richards
Sailboat types built by LaserPerformance